The Netherlands national rugby union team represents Netherlands in men's international rugby union competitions. Nicknamed The Oranges (Oranje), is considered one of the stronger tier 3 teams in European rugby and currently compete in the second division of the Rugby Europe International Championships in the Rugby Europe Trophy, a competition which is just below the Rugby Europe Championship where the top 6 countries in Europe (apart from the teams in the Six Nations) compete. They are yet to participate in any Rugby World Cup.

History

The Netherlands played their first ever game in 1930, against Belgium on 1 July. The Netherlands played Belgium and Germany as well as Romania. During the 1940s they played regularly against Belgium and Germany. The 1960s saw the side play West Germany regularly as well as other fixtures including matches against Poland, Sweden, Spain and Czechoslovakia. The 1970s saw fixtures played against many teams, notably Italy.

Record

Below is a table of the representative rugby matches played by a Netherlands national XV at test level up until 24 June 2021.

Current squad
On 22 January 2022, the following 49 players were called up for the 2022 Rugby Europe Championship.

Head Coach:  Dick Muir (as of 2 June 2022)
 Caps Updated: 23 January 2021

**

 *: Also a member of Delta squad, playing in the Rugby Europe Super Cup.
 **: Servette is a Swiss club but plays in the French league.

Call-ups
On 10 February Spike Salman of Racing 92 was called up to the squad.

Current coaching staff
The current coaching staff of the Netherlands national team:

Past Coaches
Since 1997

See also
 Rugby union in the Netherlands
 Dutch Rugby Union
 Netherlands women's national rugby union team
 Netherlands national under-20 rugby union team
 Netherlands national rugby sevens team
 Netherlands women's national rugby sevens team
 Sport in Netherlands

References

External links
Dutch Rugby Union - Official Site  

Netherlands national rugby union team
Rugby union in the Netherlands
Teams in European Nations Cup (rugby union)
European national rugby union teams
National sports teams of the Netherlands